Hans-Joachim Queisser (born 6 July 1931, Berlin, Germany) is a solid-state physicist. He is best known for co-authoring the 1961 work on solar cells that detailed what is today known as the Shockley–Queisser limit, which is now considered the key contribution in this field.

Education and career 
Queisser was born in Berlin and his father was a mechanical engineer for Siemens. In 1928 he travelled to the United States to work on power plants and asked his fiancée to join him. She wanted to return to Germany, and Hans Joachim was born shortly after their return in 1931, in Berlin. He was in Dresden during the air raid in 1945 and states that he survived "barely". His father was sent to the Soviet Union after the war, and Queisser wanted to enter the University of Berlin through an apprenticeship program and working as a technician at a research institute in Berlin. However, he instead applied for a scholarship in the United States and was accepted to the University of Kansas for 1951 and 1952. He returned to Germany and obtained his Ph.D. in physics at the University of Göttingen in 1958 under the supervision of Rudolf Hilsch.

After graduating in Göttingen, Queisser accepted a job at the Shockley Transistor Corporation in Mountain View, California, where he worked on crystal growth, epitaxy, diffusion, lattice defects, junction properties and solar cells. It was during this time that he and Shockley calculated the maximal theoretical efficiency of silicon solar cells to be around 31%. He and his co-worker Richard Finch first identified oxygen-induced stacking faults and achieved the first transmission electron microscopy on semiconductors with J. Washburn and G. Thomas at UC Berkeley.

Queisser left Shockley for Bell Labs in 1964, working on gallium arsenide for optoelectronics. It was during this time that he invented a high-power luminescent diode, an infrared light emitting diode (LED) that now forms the basis of almost every household remote control device. Modifications of the basic design represent practically every LED in existence today. In 1966, he left Bell to become a professor at the University of Frankfurt. In 1970, he became a founding director of the Max Planck Institute for Solid State Research at Stuttgart. He served in this role until his retirement in 1998.

Honors and awards 
Queisser became a member of the German Academy of Sciences Leopoldina in 1994. He was a Fellow of the American Physical Society. He was president of the German Physical Society between 1976 and 1977.

References

External links
 "The Conquest of the Microchip", Queisser's autobiographical work on the early history of Silicon Valley, 
 "Bringing Silicon to the Valley", presentation by Queisser on the history of Silicon Valley, with materials.

20th-century German physicists
1931 births
Living people
Officers Crosses of the Order of Merit of the Federal Republic of Germany
Recipients of the Order of Merit of Baden-Württemberg
Fellows of the American Physical Society
Members of the German Academy of Sciences Leopoldina
Presidents of the German Physical Society
Max Planck Institute directors
Academic staff of Goethe University Frankfurt
Humboldt University of Berlin alumni
University of Göttingen alumni
People from Berlin